Giorgio Di Genova (born 23 October 1933 in Rome) is an Italian art historian, critic and curator, mostly known for being the author of History of Italian Art of the Twentieth Century.

Biography 
Di Genova graduated in History of Art at La Sapienza University of Rome with a dissertation on Silvestro Lega. He then became a member of the Italian Communist Party, only to leave after the Hungarian Revolution of 1956.

In 1975 he founded the quarterly magazine Third Eye, published by Bora in Bologna, which he edited until 2006. In 1984 he was the curator of the Italian Pavilion at the 41st edition of the Venice Biennale, where he invited Antonio Bueno, Mario Padovan and Novello Finotti. In 1993 he was one of the organizers of the 12th Rome Quadriennale.

In 1980 he was appointed Artistic Director of the National Biennial of Contemporary Art in the Province of Rieti. The first edition, Generation Twenties, was followed by two more, Generazione Anni Dieci (1982) and Generazione Primo Decennio (1985). Disagreements over the direction of the biennial lead to Di Genova's resignation in 1986. In 1990 he started working on a revised and expanded edition of his bookHistory of Italian Art of the Twentieth Century (1981).

In 1999 Di Genova was one of the founders of Museo MAGI '900 in Pieve di Cento near Bologna. Di Genova was also Artistic Director until his resignation in 2006. In 2008, he was appointed Artistic Director of the Lìmen International Art Prize by the Chamber of Commerce of Vibo Valentia.

Works 
“Il Prometeo”. Scultura di Vittorio Amadio. Collezioni ed esposizioni temporanee ed itineranti - Sala Consiliare - Castel di Lama (Ascoli Piceno).La Sfinge.1997 Ascoli Piceno, Italy
Enrico Accatino. La circolarità dello spirito. IGER, 1991, Roma, Italy
Fiannacca. Storia e geografia delle belle arti e delle arti decorative. Artisti. Edizioni Bora, 1990, Bologna, Italy
GAD. Gruppo Aniconismo Dialettico. W. Coccetta, A. Di Girolamo, Renzo Eusebi, G. Leto, La Sfinge, 1990, Ascoli Piceno, Italy
Gruppo aniconismo dialettico, GAD. Con un omaggio a Pasquale Di Fabio, Edizioni De Luca, 1999, Roma, Italy
Carlo Verdecchia, 1905 - 1984  Storia e geografia delle belle arti e delle arti decorative. Artisti - Palazzo Ducale - Atri (Teramo), Edizioni De Luca, 1998, Roma, Italy
History of Italian Art of the Twentieth Century, Bologna, Bora, 1981, ISBN  IT \ ICCU \ CFI \ 0039104
 Marzio Banfi: The Scenes of the Unconscious (2000-2003), Bologna, Bora, 2003, 
 Idioms of Contemporary Sculpture 2, Milan, Electa, 1989,

References 

1933 births
Italian art historians
Italian art critics
Italian art curators
Directors of museums in Italy
Italian magazine editors
Living people